Kinsman Mountain is a mountain located in Grafton County, New Hampshire. It is named after Nathan Kinsman, an early resident of Easton, New Hampshire, and is part of the Kinsman Range of the White Mountains.  To the northeast, Kinsman is connected by The Cannon Balls ridge to Cannon Mountain.

The west side of Kinsman drains into Reel and Slide Brooks, thence into the Ham Branch of the Gale River, the Gale River, Ammonoosuc River, Connecticut River, and into Long Island Sound in Connecticut. 
The east side drains into Cascade Brook, thence into the Pemigewasset River, the Merrimack River, and into the Gulf of Maine in Massachusetts. 
The south face drains into Eliza Brook, thence into Harvard Brook, another tributary of the Pemigewasset.

South Kinsman is the sixth most prominent of the White Mountains, and is the highest point between Franconia Notch and Kinsman Notch.

The summit of North Kinsman Mountain is viewless, but a short bushwhack to the east takes hikers to steep granite ledges that fall off to Kinsman Pond and offer views of Cannon Mountain, South Kinsman, Franconia Ridge, and Lonesome Lake.

See also

 List of mountains in New Hampshire
 White Mountain National Forest

External links
 
 
 
 
  South Kinsman. HikeTheWhites.com

Kinsman
Kinsman
Kinsman
Mountains on the Appalachian Trail